Stictiella villegasi, the Algodones sand wasp, is a species of sand wasp in the family Crabronidae. It is endemic to the Algodones Dunes in North America.

References

Crabronidae
Articles created by Qbugbot
Insects described in 1982